The GRE subject test in biology was a standardized test in the United States created by the Educational Testing Service, and is designed to assess a candidate's potential for graduate or post-graduate study in the field of biology. The test is comprehensive and covers—in equal proportions—molecular biology, organismal biology, and ecology and evolution.

This exam, like all the GRE subject tests, is paper-based, as opposed to the GRE general test which is usually computer-based.  It contains 194 questions, which are to be answered within 2 hours and 50 minutes.  Scores on this exam are required for entrance to some biology Ph.D. programs in the United States.

Scores are scaled and then reported as a number between 200 and 990; however, in recent versions of the test, the maximum and minimum reported scores have been 940 (corresponding to the 99 percentile) and 400 (1 percentile) respectively. The mean score for all test takers from July, 2009, to July, 2012, was 658 with a standard deviation of 123.

Tests generally took place three times per year, on one Saturday in each of September, October, and April.   ETS took the decision to discontinue the test after April 2021.

Content specification
Since many students who apply to graduate programs in biology do so during the first half of their fourth year, the scope of most questions is largely that of the first three years of a standard American undergraduate biology curriculum. A sampling of test item content is given below:

Cell and molecular biology (33–35%) 
 Cell biology
 Metabolism
 Genetics
 Microbiology/immunology

Organismal biology (33–34%) 
 Animal anatomy and physiology
 Plant anatomy and physiology
 Biodiversity

Ecology and evolution (33–34%) 
 Ecosystems
 Behavioral ecology
 Evolutionary processes
 History of life

See also
 Graduate Record Examination
 GRE Biochemistry Test
 GRE Chemistry Test
 GRE Literature in English Test
 GRE Mathematics Test
 GRE Physics Test
 GRE Psychology Test
 Graduate Management Admission Test (GMAT)
 Graduate Aptitude Test in Engineering (GATE)

References

GRE standardized tests
Biology education
Standardized tests